The Mini-Skirt Mob is a 1968 outlaw biker film about an all-female motorcycle gang. The film was directed by Maury Dexter, and stars Diane McBain, Jeremy Slate, Sherry Jackson, Patty McCormack, Harry Dean Stanton and Sandra Marshall.

Plot

Jilted by her ex-boyfriend Jeff Logan, Shayne (the leader of an all-female motorcycle gang) and her new boyfriend Lon decide to torment Jeff and his new bride, Connie. The harassment backfires when Shayne's sister Edie is accidentally killed by a Molotov cocktail and when Shayne herself ends up hanging by her fingernails off a cliff.

Cast
 Jeremy Slate as Lon
 Diane McBain as Shayne
 Sherry Jackson as Connie
 Patty McCormack as Edie
 Ross Hagen as Jeff
 Harry Dean Stanton as "Spook"

Reception
Maury Dexter says the film was the most successful of all the ones he made at AIP.

From Nostalgia Central:There is plenty of rambunctious vitality and crude humour but the film never stoops for the cheap thrill. It’s sharply-paced, well-photographed, and the whole production has a great sense of freedom.

See also
List of American films of 1968

References

Further reading 
  Pdf.

External links
 

1968 films
1960s action films
1960s exploitation films
Outlaw biker films
Films directed by Maury Dexter
Films scored by Les Baxter
American International Pictures films
1960s English-language films